Hello Taxi (German: Hallo Taxi) is a 1958 Austrian comedy film directed by Hermann Kugelstadt and starring Hans Moser, Paul Hörbiger and Oskar Sima. Two old friends in Vienna, both carriage drivers, fall out when one of them buys a modern taxi.

It was shot at the Schönbrunn Studios in Vienna.

Main cast
 Hans Moser as Leopold Gruber  
 Paul Hörbiger as Franz Schwarzl  
 Oskar Sima as Kommerzienrat Schellnegger  
 Lucie Englisch as Adele Schellnegger  
 Gerlinde Locker as Lisa  
 Walter Kohut as Herbert Gerlinger  
 Brigitte Antonius as Pipsi
 Jürgen Holl as Karl Schellnegger

References

Bibliography 
 Bergfelder, Tim & Bock, Hans-Michael. The Concise Cinegraph: Encyclopedia of German. Berghahn Books, 2009.

External links 
 

1958 films
Austrian comedy films
1958 comedy films
1950s German-language films
Films directed by Hermann Kugelstadt
Schönbrunn Studios films
Films set in Vienna
Films shot in Vienna
Films about taxis
Films scored by Hans Lang